"A Stranger in My Place" is a song by Kenny Rogers and Kin Vassy (a member of The First Edition), first recorded on Kenny Rogers & The First Edition's 1970 album Something's Burning. The most successful charting single of the song was by Canadian country pop artist Anne Murray. Released in February 1971, it was the second single from her album Straight, Clean and Simple. It peaked at number 1 on the Canadian RPM Country Tracks chart. It also reached number 27 on the Billboard Hot Country Singles chart in the United States.

In the course of 1971, the song was also covered by Bill Anderson (on his album Always Remember) and Del Reeves (on his album The Del Reeves Album). In 1972 it was covered by Joan Baez on her Come from the Shadows album.

In 1980, the song charted again for Jimmy "Orion" Ellis, reaching #69 on the country charts.

Chart performance (Anne Murray version)

References

1970 songs
1971 singles
Kenny Rogers songs
Bill Anderson (singer) songs
Del Reeves songs
Anne Murray songs
Joan Baez songs
Capitol Records singles
Songs written by Kin Vassy
Songs written by Kenny Rogers